Diana Arterian is an American poet, writer, critic, editor, and translator.

Life 
Arterian was born and raised in Arizona. She attended California Institute of the Arts, where she obtained her MFA and worked under Maggie Nelson, as well as the University of Southern California where she earned her PhD in Literature and Creative Writing.

Work 
Arterian's criticism has appeared widely, including in New York Times Review of Books, The Rumpus, Los Angeles Review of Books, and Boston Review, and she curates the "Annotated Nightstand" column at Literary Hub.

Arterian's co-translations of the work of the late Afghan poet Nadia Anjuman with Marina Omar are published in a variety of journals, including Apogee Journal, Arkansas International Review, Asymptote Journal, North American Review, and Poet Lore. The composer Reena Esmail set some of these co-translations to music, the performances of which have received positive reviews.

Bibliography

Collections 

 Playing Monster :: Seiche (1913 Press, 2017). OCLC 780002302
 Death Centos (Ugly Duckling Presse, 2014). OCLC 858816486.

Edited anthology 

 Among Margins: Critical & Lyrical Writing on Aesthetics (Ricochet Editions, 2016). OCLC 956693921.

References 

People from Arizona
Writers from Arizona
Year of birth missing (living people)
Living people